Trichococcus is a mesophilic and psychrotolerant genus of bacteria from the family of Carnobacteriaceae. Trichococcus bacteria have the ability to utilize sugars, sugar alcohols and polysaccharides. Some species of Trichococcus species where transferred from the genera Lactosphaera and Ruminococcus.

References

Lactobacillales
Bacteria genera
Taxa described in 1984